Willis Sweet (January 1, 1856 – July 9, 1925) was the first United States Representative elected from Idaho following statehood in 1890. Sweet served as a Republican in the House from 1890 to 1895, representing the state at-large. He vigorously demanded "Free Silver" or the unrestricted coinage of silver into legal tender, in order to pour money into the large silver mining industry in the Mountain West, but he was defeated by supporters of the gold standard.

Early years
Born in Alburgh, Vermont on New Year's Day 1856, Sweet attended public schools and the University of Nebraska in Lincoln, and was a member of the Phi Delta Theta fraternity. He learned the printer's trade in Lincoln and relocated west to Moscow in the Idaho Territory in 1881. Sweet was the first editor of the Moscow Mirror in 1882,  studied law and became an attorney, judge, and supreme court justice in the territory. Also a territorial legislator, he was instrumental in bringing the University of Idaho to Moscow, and was the first president of its board of regents.

Career
Sweet was a candidate for the U.S. Senate in 1896, but was defeated in the Idaho Legislature by Populist Henry Heitfeld. He was an attorney in northern Idaho in Coeur d'Alene until his appointment as the attorney general of Puerto Rico in 1903. Sweet served until 1905 and then worked as a newspaper editor in San Juan from 1913 until his death in 1925.

While in Congress from 1890 to 1895, Sweet was a leading advocate of the free and unlimited coinage of silver, which would pour large sums of money into Idaho. He closely followed Charles Parnell, the Irish agitator in the British Parliament, who managed to force consideration of his proposals by blocking the legislative process there. Sweet tried to block everything until he got his Free Silver, but he was blocked by Speaker Thomas Reed. When William McKinley was nominated for president in 1896 on a gold standard platform, Sweet supported silver advocate William Jennings Bryan, who was running on the Democratic, Populist, and Silver Republican party labels.

Residence Hall in his honor
A residence hall at the University of Idaho is named for Sweet.
Opened  the building is now Carol Ryrie Brink Hall, a faculty office  The Willis Sweet residence hall was relocated to the new Theophilus Tower  and later to the former McConnell Hall, on the northeast corner of Sixth and Rayburn

References

Further reading
 Johnson, Claudius O. "The Story of Silver Politics in Idaho, 1892-1902." Pacific Northwest Quarterly  (1942): 283-296. Online

External links

 

1856 births
1925 deaths
People from Alburgh, Vermont
Republican Party members of the United States House of Representatives from Idaho
Members of the Idaho Territorial Legislature
19th-century American politicians